Bernard Hocke is a television and film actor. He first appeared in the 1989 horror film Beware! Children at Play as Professor Randall. Since then he has appeared in numerous films and television series, including Seinfeld, Mad About You, the pilot of Sports Night, Green Lantern, and in 2012, The Philly Kid.

Filmography
In the Electric Mist (2009) as  Murphy Doucet
Antebellum (2020) as talking head

References

External links

Living people
American male film actors
American male television actors
Year of birth missing (living people)